National Highway 111 (NH 111) is a National Highway in India entirely within the state of Chhattisgarh.

Route
 Ratanpur
 Pali
 Katghora
 Kendai

See also
 List of National Highways in India (by Highway Number)
 List of National Highways in India
 National Highways Development Project

References

External links
  NH network map of India

111
National highways in India (old numbering)